Nwakaego (Ego) Boyo (born September 6, 1968) is a Nigerian actor, producer, executive producer and creative entrepreneur who is popular for her role as Anne Haatrope in the early 90s soap, Checkmate.  She is the founder and Managing Director  of Temple Productions, Temple films and Temple Studio.

Early life 
Boyo was born in Queen Elizabeth Hospital, Umuahia, Nigeria during the Nigerian Civil War to the family of Augustine Nnamani and Gloria Nnamani Nee Harewood.

She left Nigeria at just ten days old during the Nigerian Civil War and lived in Barbados for the first four years of her life before returning to Enugu in 1971. In 1976, her family moved to Lagos. She has a Bachelor of Arts in Theater Art from the University of Benin.

Career
Boyo started her career in the early 1990s series Checkmate, where she played the character of Anne Haatrope, acting alongside Francis Agu and Richard Mofe Damijo. After Checkmate wrapped up in 1995, Boyo started work with Igwe on the film Violated, which was released in 1996. Several members of the Checkmate cast and crew also worked on the film, which was well received by the audience. She started her own production company, Temple Productions in 1996. She produced the silent movie A Hotel Called Memory in 2017, which won the audience award for best experimental film at the BlackStar Film Festival in Philadelphia.

The studio was set up in 1998 with its first set of digital equipment, one of the first companies to do so as the industry made the gradual change from unstick equipment. In 1998, she bought digital equipment and opened an office on Dolphin Estate in Lagos with a staff of ten.

Temple's first major client was 'The Obasanjo For President' campaign in 1998, for which the company produced jingles, music videos and advertisements. Other major corporate clients including-dividing technical support for the industry meant the company went on to great success.

She was the 60th president of International Women Society (IWS), an independent, non-political, non-governmental and non-profit organisation founded in 1957.

Filmography

Advocacy 
She was Global Rights Ambassador for Global Rights Nigeria; whose work focuses on combating sexual violence against women.

As the founder and trustee of Tempio Media Advocacy and Information Foundation, she is focused on highlighting women's education and women's healthcare. The foundation works with the non-governmental organizations on their visual messaging to help educate the less privileged. She has worked on documentary and advocacy videos focusing on maternal health as well as sexual assault. She is the Chair of the Advisory board of the Lagos Fringe Theatre Festival, a multi disciplinary Festival which runs annually in Nigeria and encompasses the full spectrum of artistic diversities and also on the governing board of the Mirabel center, the first sexual assault referral center (SARC) in Nigeria.

As an advocate for education, Boyo was on the advisory board of Oando Foundation, which has founded schools across Nigeria to create a sustainable educational system that will empower pupils and was a member of the Nigerian Oscar Selection committee.

She previously served as a member of the advisory board of the Oando Foundation and was the 60th president of The International Women’s society, and a member of the charity serving in multiple capacities. and a non executive director on the board of Lagos Preparatory and Secondary School, Ikoyi, a private British curriculum School based in Lagos.

Personal life
Ego is married with children to Omamofe Boyo since 1992, the deputy group chief executive officer at Oando Plc. She has three children.

References

External links
 

Living people
1968 births
University of Benin (Nigeria) alumni
People from Enugu
People of the Nigerian Civil War
Nigerian expatriates in Barbados
Founders of Nigerian schools and colleges
Actresses from Lagos
20th-century Nigerian actresses
Educators from Lagos
Nigerian women educators
21st-century Nigerian actresses
Nigerian chief executives
Nigerian film producers
Nigerian businesspeople
Nigerian women in business
Nigerian television actresses
Nigerian humanitarians
Igbo actresses
Nigerian film actresses